Golab-e Pain (also Romanized as Golāb-e Pā’īn; also known as Golāb) is a village in Momenabad Rural District, in the Central District of Sarbisheh County, South Khorasan Province, Iran. At the 2006 census, its population was 11, in 4 families.

References 

Populated places in Sarbisheh County